Hope Davis is an American actress. She is known for her performances on stage and screen earning various awards and nominations including a Tony Award nomination, as well two Primetime Emmy Awards, and two Golden Globe Award nominations.

She made her film debut in Joel Schumacher's Flatliners in 1990. She then starred in the critically acclaimed films The Daytrippers (1996), About Schmidt (2002), and Infamous (2006). She received a Golden Globe Award for Best Supporting Actress – Motion Picture nomination for her role in American Splendor (2003). She received an Independent Spirit Award and a Gotham Independent Film Award with the cast of Synecdoche, New York (2008). In 2016, she joined the Marvel Cinematic Universe portraying Tony Stark's mother Maria Stark in Captain America: Civil War.

In 1992, she made her Broadway theatre debut in Two Shakespearean Actors. In 1997 she starred as Sasha in Ivanov opposite Kevin Kline and Marian Seldes. She earned acclaim for her role in Yazmina Reza's God of Carnage in 2009 acting alongside Jeff Daniels, Marcia Gay Harden, and James Gandolfini. For her performance she received a nomination for the Tony Award for Best Actress in a Play.

She made her television debut in the Dick Wolf NBC series Deadline which ran from 2000 to 2001. She then starred in ABC drama Six Degrees from 2006 to 2007. She earned a Primetime Emmy Award for Outstanding Supporting Actress in a Drama Series nomination for HBO's In Treatment in 2009. The following year she earned nominations for the Primetime Emmy Award for Outstanding Lead Actress in a Limited or Anthology Series or Movie, and the Golden Globe Award for Best Supporting Actress – Series, Miniseries or Television Film for her portrayal of Hillary Clinton in HBO television movie The Special Relationship (2010). 

She continued acting in projects such as the limited series Mildred Pierce (2011), the political drama The Newsroom (2012-2013), the miniseries Your Honor (2020-2023), and Succession (2021-present). The latter earned her an Emmy nomination for Outstanding Guest Actress in a Drama Series.

Career

Film
Davis made her debut as a dramatic actress in the 1990 film Flatliners, starring as William Baldwin's fiancée. She then appeared in the hit film Home Alone in a small role as a Parisian airport receptionist. Later, she starred in independent films such as The Daytrippers (1995) and Next Stop Wonderland (1998). These led her to roles in Hollywood films such as the thriller Arlington Road (1999), and About Schmidt (2002). In 2003, she starred opposite Paul Giamatti in the movie adaptation of the Harvey Pekar comic American Splendor as the comic book version of Pekar's real-life wife, Joyce Brabner. For this role, Davis won the New York Film Critics Circle award and was nominated for a Golden Globe for Best Actress in a Supporting Role. In 2009, she was cast as Hillary Clinton in the BBC / HBO film The Special Relationship, released in 2010. 

She has received a nomination for Emmy Award for Outstanding Lead Actress – Miniseries or a Movie for her performance as Clinton. In 2015, she was approached by Marvel to play Maria Stark, mother of Tony Stark in Captain America: Civil War.

Stage
Her major stage debut came after she starred in the Wisdom Bridge/Remains Theater co-production of David Mamet's play Speed-the-Plow for Joel Schumacher with William Petersen in Chicago in 1992. Later, she had lead roles in the New York premiere of Rebecca Gilman's Spinning into Butter in 2000, and in the 2005 audio play Hope Leaves the Theater, written and directed by Charlie Kaufman. This was a segment of the sound-only production Theater of the New Ear, which debuted at St. Ann's Warehouse in Brooklyn, NY. The title actually refers to Davis's character "leaving the theater".

She returned to the stage in 2009, appearing in Broadway's God of Carnage with Marcia Gay Harden, James Gandolfini and Jeff Daniels, a role that gained her a Tony Award nomination for Best Leading Actress in a Play.

Television
Davis co-starred as the bitter and self-deprecating Mia with Golden Globe winner Gabriel Byrne in the second season (2009) of HBO's In Treatment, a dramatic series that tracks the backstory and progress of five patients during their series of psychological therapeutic sessions. Mia is a successful, unmarried malpractice attorney who returns to therapy with Dr. Paul Weston after a 20-year absence because of a lack of stability in her personal life.

Davis also starred in an NBC short-lived drama series called Deadline with Oliver Platt in 2001. She played the ex-wife to Platt's character at a newspaper giant.

Davis also starred in the short-lived NBC television drama, Allegiance, where she plays Katya O'Connor, an ex-KGB agent.  Her son works for the FBI/CIA, and Katya's family is brought back into action by the SVR in hopes that Alex, her son, can be swayed to join the SVR.

She later appeared in a reoccurring capacity on Wayward Pines and American Crime.

In 2020, Davis narrated The Truth About Fat episode of the PBS television series Nova.

Personal life
Davis, second of three children, was born in Englewood, New Jersey, the daughter of Joan, a librarian, and William Davis, an engineer. Davis has described her mother as a "great storyteller" who would take Davis and her siblings to museums or to "something cultural" every Sunday after church. Davis was raised in Tenafly, New Jersey, and graduated in 1982 from Tenafly High School.

She was a childhood friend of Mira Sorvino, who lived almost directly across the street, and with whom she wrote and acted in backyard plays. Davis has a degree in cognitive science from Vassar College. She studied acting at HB Studio in New York City. She is married to actor Jon Patrick Walker. They have two daughters, Georgia (born August 31, 2002) and Mae (born December 30, 2004).

Filmography

Film

Television

Stage

Awards and nominations

References

External links
 
 

Actresses from New Jersey
American film actresses
American stage actresses
American television actresses
Living people
People from Englewood, New Jersey
People from Tenafly, New Jersey
Tenafly High School alumni
Vassar College alumni
20th-century American actresses
21st-century American actresses
Year of birth missing (living people)